Brachystegia zenkeri is a species of plant in the family Fabaceae. It is found only in Cameroon. It is threatened by habitat loss.

References

zenkeri
Endemic flora of Cameroon
Trees of Africa
Vulnerable flora of Africa
Taxonomy articles created by Polbot
Taxobox binomials not recognized by IUCN